Keeley Davis (born January 4, 1976) is an American guitarist, singer, songwriter and graphic designer. He is best known as a member of the post-hardcore band At the Drive-In, with whom he has recorded one studio album, In•ter a•li•a (2017). Davis is also a former member of the rock bands Sparta and Engine Down.

Career
He was the primary lead singer of the band Engine Down, in which he also played guitar. He was also in the band Denali with his sister, Maura Davis. He played bass and synthesizer.

Engine Down disbanded (under friendly circumstances) after a farewell tour in 2005, and Davis joined Sparta as lead guitarist. Davis has since recollaborated with Maura in the ambient indie rock side-project Glös, formed by him and former Engine Down drummer Cornbread Compton. Their debut album, Harmonium, was released in April 2007 on Lovitt Records. As of 2009, he is working with new band, Heks Orkest, which features longtime collaborators, Jonathon Fuller and Cam DiNinzio. As of March 2016, Davis is a touring member of At the Drive-In, following the sudden departure of guitarist and founding member Jim Ward. Since 2005, Davis has performed alongside Ward in Sparta.

With Bughummer
Getaway With (1998)

Drummer Brian Lackey
Guitar Jon Proctor

With Engine Down
Under the Pretense of Present Tense (1999)
To Bury Within the Sound (2000)
Demure (2002)
Engine Down (2004)

With Denali
Denali (2002)
The Instinct (2003)

With Sparta
Threes (2006)

With Glös
Harmonium (2007)

With Heks Orkest
(2 songs free) (2009)

With at the Drive-In
in•ter a•li•a (2017)
 Diamanté (2017)

Equipment with Sparta

Unlike bandmate Jim Ward, Davis keeps relatively the same guitar and amp setup on each tour. All of Davis' pedals, two guitars and one amplifier were stolen when their storage facility in Los Angeles was broken into, so the equipment he performs with as of May 2007 is mostly new.

Guitars
 Rickenbacker 330
 Gibson Les Paul Special Double Cut
 Epiphone 50th Anniversary 1961 SG Special

Amplifiers
 Orange 100 Watt Rockerverb Amp
 Orange 4x12 Cab

Effects
Line 6 DM-4
Line 6 DL-4
Line 6 MM-4
Digitech Whammy

Equipment with at the Drive-In
Gretsch G2622T TG Streamliner

References

External links

 Sparta's Official Site
 Keeley's Post Production Company – MONDIAL
 The Liberty Movement Zine – Interview with Keeley

Sparta (band) members
Living people
American rock guitarists
Alternative rock guitarists
American male singer-songwriters
Alternative rock singers
American rock singers
American rock songwriters
Singer-songwriters from Virginia
1976 births
Guitarists from Virginia
American male guitarists
21st-century American singers
21st-century American guitarists
21st-century American male singers